Delta Farm, also known as the J.W. Scott Robinson Farm, is a historic home and farm located near Ivanhoe, Sampson County, North Carolina.   The house was built in 1910, and is a two-story, five bay by four bay, double pile, Colonial Revival style frame dwelling.  It has a hipped roof with front gable, brick pier foundation, and a front wrap-around porch. The interior features excellent woodwork. Also on the property are the contributing gas house, two-room servants-ironing house, two smokehouses, a storage house, root cellar, the remnants of the washhouse, and a former brick flower pit.

It was added to the National Register of Historic Places in 1986.

References

Farms on the National Register of Historic Places in North Carolina
Colonial Revival architecture in North Carolina
Houses completed in 1910
Buildings and structures in Sampson County, North Carolina
National Register of Historic Places in Sampson County, North Carolina